20 is an Italian free-to-air television channel, operated by Mediaset and owned by MFE - MediaForEurope. It was founded and started to broadcast in 2018.

History 
Following the acquisition of channel 20 from the Television Broadcasting System Group, from 5 May 2017 to 22 March 2018, Mediaset broadcast a provisional program consisting of fiction and telenovelas from the Mediaset library, with the brand Retecapri, which, from 22 March 2018, had given way to promos advertising the new channel 20.

Launch 
The channel officially launched at 7:30pm on 3 April 2018 with the first round of the quarterfinals of the UEFA Champions League between Juventus F.C. and Real Madrid C.F. followed by the exclusive match in free-to-air, averaging 6,569,000 viewers and 23.35% ratings share. It was the most watched program that evening.

Transmission 
The channel airs on digital terrestrial television (DTT) in SD on channel 20 in the Mediaset 2 multiplex and in HD on Tivù Sat. It is available with two audio tracks in Italian and original language.

From 1 June 2018, it is available in HD also on DTT on channel 520 in La3 multiplex.

From 12 September 2018, the channel's SD feed is also available on Tivù Sat.

Since 2 January 2020, 20 is available on Sky Italia channel 151.

Programming 
20 proposes principally TV-Series, films and sport events.

TV Series 

 Agent X 
 Anger Management
 Badass!
 Blood Drive
 Chicago Fire
 Community
 Containment
 Covert Affairs
 Frequency
 Grimm 
 Gotham
 Heroes Reborn
 Homeland
 Hostages
 House
 Hyde and Seek
 In Plain Sight
 Imposters
 Lucifer 
 Miracle Workers 
 Mr. Robot
 Murder in the First 
 New Amsterdam
 Renegade
 Person of Interest
 Psych
 Proof 
 Suits
 Station 19
 Shades of Blue
 Taken
 The 100
 The Big Bang Theory
 The Following
 The Girlfriend Experience 
 The Last Kingdom
 The Mentalist
 The Simpsons
 The Sinner
 The Vampire Diaries
 Two and a Half Men
 Walker Texas Ranger

Sport events 

 International football friendlies
 UEFA Nations League
 UEFA Euro 2020 qualifying
 UEFA Youth League 
 Formula E (14 races live)
 Extreme E
 Super Bowl LIV
 Autumn Nations Cup
 FIFA Club World Cup
 2022 FIFA World Cup qualification (UEFA)
 Coppa Italia
 Italian Open (International BNL of Italia, 2021)

References

External links
 

Mediaset television channels
Italian-language television stations
Television channels and stations established in 2018